Antarctica is a 1995 Spanish thriller film directed by Manuel Huerga and written by Francisco Casavella which stars Ariadna Gil and Carlos Fuentes.

Plot 
The road movie-like fiction starts in Barcelona, then moving to other settings. María (a former rock star hooked on heroin) and Rafa flee from Velasco after the former seized a drug cache.

Cast

Production 
The screenplay was penned by Francisco Casavella upon request from Manuel Huerga, who had unsuccessfully tried to adapt Casavella's novel El triunfo into a feature film. The film was produced by Sogetel SA and Iberoamericana Films with the participation of Canal+. Andrés Vicente Gómez is credited as producer, whereas Fernando de Garcillán and Pepo Sol took over executive production duties. The film was shot in Portugal.

Release 
Selected for the 'Fast Lane' lineup intended to showcase debut feature films, the film premiered at the 52nd Venice International Film Festival. It was theatrically released in Spain on 8 September 1995.

Reception 
David Stratton of Variety assessed that the film's "second half is more successful than the first", also pointing out that the film is "handsomely produced".

Casimiro Torreiro of El País considered the film "stimulating, sometimes brilliant and occasionally overwhelming", but he also pointed out that the plot features some elements left over (pertaining the gesticulating thug) as well as it is missing more definition from Vidarte's "unsettling" character.

Accolades 

|-
| align = "center" rowspan = "4" | 1996 || rowspan = "4" | 10th Goya Awards || Best Actress || Ariadna Gil ||  || rowspan = "4" | 
|-
| Best New Director || Manuel Huerga || 
|-
| Best New Actor || Carlos Fuentes || 
|-
| Best Cinematography || Javier Aguirresarobe || 
|}

See also 
 List of Spanish films of 1995

References 

Films directed by Manuel Huerga
Films shot in Portugal
Films set in Barcelona
Spanish thriller films
1990s Spanish-language films
Spanish road movies
Films scored by John Cale
1990s Spanish films